The 2010 I-League 2nd division was the third season of the second tier of the I-League, the highest football league in India. It commenced on 26 March 2010 with the first matches of the first round and ended in early May 2010 with the last matches of the promotion round. All matches are played in three venues at Delhi, Bangalore and Tripura.

Team summaries
The first round was competed by 21 teams, which have been divided into three groups with seven teams each.

First round
Each team competed a single match against every other team of its group. The best two teams from each group advanced to the final round.

Group A

Group table

Results

Group B

Group table

Results

Group C

Group table

Results

Final round
Malabar United and Hindustan Aeronautics from Group A, SESA and ONGC from Group B and NISA and Oil India FC from Group C qualified for the final round. They will be joined by the sides having been relegated from the 2008–09 I-League, Mohammedan Sporting Club from Kolkata and Vasco Sporting Club from Goa. As in the first round, each club will play a single match against every other team of the group. All matches will be played at Bangalore.

Preview of final round
Eight teams will vie for a place in the next year ONGC I-League as Second Division final round goes underway from 30 April at the KSFA Stadium, Bangalore.
With two last year relegated teams (Mohammedan Sporting and Vasco SC ) and with six qualifiers from the preliminary round viz. NISA (Manipur), ONGC (Mumbai), Sesa Football Academy (Goa), Oil India (Assam), Malabar United (Kerala) and the local side HAL (Bangalore) the final round is all set to be a blockbuster event.
It will be clash of two Goan outfit in the opening match as Vasco SC will take on their city rival Sesa Football Academy that will kick off at 1400 hrs, while HAL will host Malabar United in the second encounter of the day that will start at 1600 hrs.
The preliminary round performance will surely boost all the qualifiers but final round is totally a different ball game and it was clearly seen in the last year's final round, when Sesa Football Academy after putting an impressive display in the first round, went on to go down in all the crucial final round matches.
The most surprising team of the lot was without a doubt Kerala based side Malabar United, who kept their domination in the Group A even with the likes of HAL, SBT and BEML.

The best two teams from the final round will qualify for the 2010–11 I-League.

Round 1 summary
Saturday, 1 May 2010: Vasco and HAL lead the pack after Round 1. After splitting points in the first game, former I-league team, Mohammedan Sporting is languishing at the lower half. However, early days of the I-league final phase, so, a lot of changes are expected to take place as the game progresses.

Round 2 summary
Thursday, 5 May 2010: Former I-league division 1 team, HAL leads the table after their morale boosting win over Oil India. Another big wig, Mohammedan Sporting is following them closely, thanks to their convincing win over NISA, Manipur today. Both the top team meets on a derby-like clash on Sunday, 9 May. ONGC on 3rd spot is the other unbeaten team. Malabar and Vasco, with one win and loss are at 4th and 5th spot respectively. Both the teams need to get their act together and perform well in the coming rounds. The bottom-placed teams, NISA, Oil India, and Sesa are surely lacking experience in playing in the big stage. After completion of round HAL still leads the pack, and Mohammedan, ONGC share second spot. All the 4 matches produced results. Vasco lost their match. Malabar United won against SESA FA.

Round 3 summary
Saturday, 9 May 2010: After round 3 HALSC and ONGC leads the table, HAL has been leading the table after each round sofar and with 3 wins looks like a candidate for promotion to Division 1. Sesa and Oil India drew a 2–2 draw and Malabar united lost to ONGC 1–3, which is surprising as Malabar showed lot of promise in group rounds. On match day 2, local team HAL SC beat Mohammedan Sporting 4–1, in front of almost 10,000 people. Second match of the day was between NISA and Vasco, Vasco defeated NISA 2–0.

Round 4 summary
Round 4 started on 12 May and 13 May. On match day 1 ONGC defeated Oil India 4–1, Mohammedan Sporting defeated SESA 2–1. On second match day Malabar United defeated NISA for their second win in final round. Final match of the round 4 was played between local favourites HALSC and Vasco with HAL winning 2–1. After completion of round 4 HAL are still leading the table, along with ONGC. One point separates from 3 to 5 positions.

Round 5 summary
Round 5 starts on 16 May and 17 May. League leader clashed on second match day with ONGC FC winning over local team HALSC and jumping to first place in the standings. NISA, SESA, Oil India are out of qualification after NISA, SESA, Oil India drew matches.

Round 6 summary
Round 6 starts on 20 May and 21 May. On match day 1 Local favorites HALSC beat NISA 2–1 with satish kumar jr scoring the winning goal for HALSC in 87th minute and in the second match of the day VASCO SC drubbed Oil India 4–0. With these wins HALSC moves to top of the table with 15 points.

Round 7 summary
Round 7 starts on 24 May and 25 May.

Group table

Results

Round 1

Round 2

Round 3

Round 4

Round 5

Round 6

Round 7

Overall

References

I-League 2nd Division seasons
2
India